Denys Graham  (born 29 June 1926) is a Welsh actor who appeared in the later series of Rumpole of the Bailey as his many daughtered colleague Percy Hoskins. He also played a range of other roles on stage and screen.

He was educated at New College, Oxford and trained at the Royal Academy of Dramatic Art.

He is best known for his role as Kaiser Wilhelm II in the 1979 film All Quiet on the Western Front.

Filmography

Notes

1926 births
Living people
People from Newport, Wales
Welsh male stage actors
Welsh male film actors
Welsh male television actors
People educated at Stanwell School
Alumni of New College, Oxford
Alumni of RADA